The 1892 United States presidential election in Nevada took place on November 8, 1892. All contemporary 44 states were part of the 1892 United States presidential election. State voters chose three electors to the Electoral College, which selected the president and vice president.

Nevada was won by the Populist nominees, James B. Weaver of Iowa and his running mate James G. Field of Virginia. Weaver and Field defeated the Republican nominees, incumbent President Benjamin Harrison of Indiana and his running mate Whitelaw Reid of New York. The state constituted the Populist Party's highest margin of victory in the election.

Results

Results by county

See also
 United States presidential elections in Nevada

Notes

References

Nevada
1892
1892 Nevada elections